Carla Diane Savage is an American computer scientist and mathematician, a professor of computer science at North Carolina State University and a former secretary of the American Mathematical Society (2013-2020).

Education and research
Savage earned her Ph.D. in 1977 from the University of Illinois at Urbana–Champaign under the supervision of David E. Muller; her thesis concerned parallel graph algorithms. Much of her more recent research has concerned Gray codes and algorithms for efficient generation of combinatorial objects.

Awards and honors
In 2012 she became a fellow of the American Mathematical Society. In 2019 she was named a SIAM Fellow "for outstanding research in algorithms of discrete mathematics and in computer science applications, alongside exemplary service to mathematics".

Selected publications
.
.

References

Year of birth missing (living people)
Living people
American computer scientists
20th-century American mathematicians
American women computer scientists
Women mathematicians
University of Illinois Urbana-Champaign alumni
North Carolina State University faculty
Fellows of the American Mathematical Society
Fellows of the Society for Industrial and Applied Mathematics
21st-century American mathematicians
20th-century American women
American women academics
21st-century American women